The 2005 Rosno Cup took place from 15–18 December 2005. Five games were played in Russia and one was played in the Czech Republic. The tournament was part of the 2005–06 Euro Hockey Tour.

Russia won the tournament.

Final standings

References

External links
Tournament on hockeyarchives.info

2005–06 Euro Hockey Tour
2005–06 in Swedish ice hockey
2005–06 in Russian ice hockey
2005–06 in Finnish ice hockey
2005–06 in Czech ice hockey
2005
December 2005 sports events in Europe
2005 in Moscow